Hassan Hissein (born 20 May 1992) is a Chadian footballer who plays as striker for El-Kanemi Warriors  and the Chad national football team.

Career

He played for Foullah Edifice in Chadian Premier Ligue. Now he plays for El-Kanemi Warriors in Nigeria.

On 8 May 2012, Hissein's agent announced that 3 Premier League clubs were looking at the youngster. These clubs turned out to be Sunderland, Liverpool and Newcastle.

International
Hissein debuted for Chad on 17 November 2010, in a match against Togo in Lomé. So far, he has earned 10 FIFA official and 8 unofficial caps for Chad.

See also
 List of Chad international footballers

References

1992 births
Living people
Chadian footballers
Foullah Edifice FC players
Chad international footballers
People from Wadi Fira Region
Association football utility players